Pendyal or Pendyala is an Indian surname. Notable people with the surname include:

 Pendyala Harikrishna (born 1986), Indian chess grandmaster
 Pendyala Nageswara Rao (1917–1984), Indian composer
 Pendyal Raghava Rao (1917–1987), Indian politician

Indian surnames